The Big Ten Conference Men's Basketball Coach of the Year, is an annual college basketball award presented to the top men's basketball coach in the Big Ten Conference. The winner is selected by the Big Ten media association and conference coaches. The award was first given following the 1973–74 season to Johnny Orr of Michigan. Bill Carmody is the only coach to have received the award with a losing record. Former Purdue coach Gene Keady has won the award a record seven times.

Key

Winners

Winners by school

Notes
 . Minnesota's 1997 award was vacated due to NCAA infractions.

References

Awards established in 1974
NCAA Division I men's basketball conference coaches of the year
Coach of the Year